The Bima was a bucket-line dredge. It was built to mine tin in offshore Malaysia and Indonesia. In the late 1980s, it was moved to Nome, Alaska, USA, to mine seafloor placer gold deposits in the Bering Sea off the coast. Being unprofitable at gold mining in Nome, it was sold for scrap in 1990. The barge is the largest barge to operate out of Nome for gold mining, being some 14 storeys tall. The Bima was the last commercial-scale dredging operation to operate out of Nome at sea. Prior commercial-scale land-side bucket dredges had all already shutdown by the time Bima started up.

Specifications
 Height: 14 storeys 
 Displacement: 15,000 ton 
 Length:

History
Bima was built in Singapore in 1976, by Billiton Mining, a subsidiary of Royal Dutch Shell, to mine tin off Malaysia. It was launched in 1979, to dredge tin ore in the seas off Indonesia. It was bought by Inspiration Gold Company for US$20 million, and moved to Alaska, to dredge gold in the Bering Sea off of Nome in 1986. As a gold dredge, it operated with a crew of 95, for two shifts of 48. It concluded its gold mining in 1990, and moved to Seattle, Washington, USA, to be auctioned off, as it had been unprofitable in mining gold, though it mined  of gold. At the time it was owned by Western Gold Exploration and Mining Co. of Golden, Colorado, USA; a subsidiary of Inspiration Resources Corp. of New York State, USA. It ended up being sold for scrap.

References

See also
 Myrtle Irene 
 Tuvli 160
 Christine Rose (dredge) 
 AU Grabber

Bering Sea Gold
Ships of Malaysia
Ships of Singapore
Ships of Indonesia
Ships of the United States
Dredgers